San Miguel County is the name of two counties in the United States:

 San Miguel County, Colorado
 San Miguel County, New Mexico